Events in the year 1794 in Norway.

Incumbents
Monarch: Christian VII

Events

Tromsø was issued its city charter.
Fru Haugans Hotel  in Mosjøen is founded (Northern Norway's oldest hotel in continuous operation).

Arts and literature
 Det Dramatiske Selskab in Bergen is founded.

Births

9 April – Søren Christian Sommerfelt, priest and botanist (d. 1838).
5 July - Maurits Hansen, writer (d.1842)
22 July - Peter Hersleb Harboe Castberg, priest and politician (d.1858)

Full date unknown
Johan Peder Basberg, politician
Jo Gjende, outdoorsman and freethinker (d.1884)

Deaths
29 September - Edvard Storm, poet (b.1749)

See also

References